Liu Jipiao, (1900–1992) was a Chinese architect associated with the development of Art Deco architecture in China and an oil painter of Realism. Liu's approach to architecture was to create a modern design with a distinctive Chinese aesthetic. Liu is remembered as the first Chinese Art Deco architect.

Early life and education 
On June 4, 1900, Liu was born in Meizhou, Guangdong, China. Liu's family had wealth from owning a silk dying factory. At a young age Liu took an interest in porcelain as well as Chinese and Western painting.

In 1919, Liu studied at University of Paris and by 1922 he moved to L’Ecole Nationale des Beaux Arts to study architecture and interior design. He travelled to Paris with Chinese artists Lin Fengmian and Lin Wenzheng and he connected with Chinese artists living in Paris, such as Xu Beihong. Liu was in a Paris-based art club in college called Phoebus Society, with fellow artists; Lin Wenzheng (1903–1930), Wang Daizhi and Wu Dayo (1903–1988).

Career 
In 1924, Liu exhibited fifteen paintings at Exposition Chinoise d’art ancien et moderne. He was then invited to contribute to China's pavilion section of the Exposition internationale des arts décoratifs et industriels modernes in 1925. His design for the entrance, which included a dragon and a phoenix, won awards from the French government. This new, modern design style presented at the expo became later known as Art Deco, and this expo was one of the earliest displays.

His large scale oil painting, Yang Guifei after the Bath is one of his better known painted works.

In 1929, Liu returned to China and become a professor at the Nanjing University. Between 1932 until 1937 he ran an architecture firm in the Nanjing, China, specializing in modern buildings. Liu received commissions to design residential buildings, including the Carlton Building on Huanghe Lu.

Personal life 
In 1932 he married artist Pan Fengxiao. After the Japanese invasion of Manchuria and rise of communism, in 1947, Liu and his family fled from China to United States. In the United States, Liu ran a Laundromat and then a chicken farm. By 1965, Liu retired from architecture and focused more on fine arts like painting and watercolor.

In 1992, Liu died at the age of 92 in Toms River, New Jersey.

See also
Poy Gum Lee
Robert Fan

References

External links 
Liu Jipiao website with examples of work 

Chinese architects
1900 births
1992 deaths
Painters from Guangdong
Art Deco architects
University of Paris alumni
École des Beaux-Arts alumni
Artists from Meizhou